Mercyless is death metal group from France. Active from 1987 to 2001 and again from 2011, they among others released albums on Restless Records and Century Media Records.

Reviewing Mercyless' album Abject Offerings, Metal.de called Mercyless, Loudblast and Massacra the "three pillars of the French death metal scene". Allmusic stated that Mercyless were "one of only a handful of the country's [death metal] bands to gain recognition outside their own borders".

Discography
 Abject Offerings (1992)
 Coloured Funeral (1993)
 C.O.L.D (1996)
 Sure To Be Pure (2000)
 Unholy Black Splendor (2013)
 Pathetic Divinity (2016)
 The Mother Of All Plagues (2020)

References

French death metal musical groups
Musical groups established in 1987
Musical groups disestablished in 2001
Restless Records artists
Century Media Records artists